Joanne Valda O'Meara (born 29 April 1979) is an English pop singer. She is best known for being a member of pop group S Club 7 between 1999 and 2003. Born and raised in Romford, she launched her career at age 16 working with Max Martin. O'Meara later went on to launch a solo career and was a contestant on Celebrity Big Brother in 2007.

Early life 
O'Meara was born in Romford, London, to parents Dave and Barbara. She has a brother and sister, Shane and Julie. She grew up in Collier Row, a suburban housing estate in the north of Romford in the London Borough of Havering. She was educated at Clockhouse Junior School and Bower Park School. O'Meara was given a full scholarship to attend the Italia Conti Academy of Theatre Arts, where she excelled in music, acting and dance – receiving a standing ovation by the heads and principals for her rendition of the song “Summertime”.

Career

1996–1999 

At age 16, O'Meara joined the earliest incarnation of girl group Solid HarmoniE and flew out to Sweden to work with young record producer Max Martin. She'd return to Essex and performed open mic nights until she was spotted by the S Club 7 team in a country and western bar.

1999–2003: S Club 7 

The group rose to fame by starring in their own BBC television series, Miami 7, in 1999. Over the five years they were together, S Club 7 had four UK No.1 singles, one UK No.1 album, a string of hits throughout Europe, including a top-ten single in the United States, Asia, Latin America and Africa. They recorded a total of four studio albums, released eleven singles and went on to sell over fourteen million albums worldwide. Their first album, S Club, had a strong 1990s pop sound, similar to many artists of their time. However, through the course of their career, their musical approach changed to a more dance and R&B sound which is heard mostly in their final album, Seeing Double.

The concept and brand of the group was created by Simon Fuller, also their manager through 19 Entertainment; they were signed to Polydor Records. Their television series went on to last four series, seeing the group travel across the United States and eventually ending up in Barcelona, Spain. It became popular in 100 different countries where the show was watched by over 90 million viewers. The show, which was a children's sitcom, often mirrored real life events which had occurred in S Club, including the relationship of Hannah Spearritt and Paul Cattermole, as well as the eventual departure from the group of the latter. As well as the popularity of their television series, S Club 7 won two Brit Awards—in 2000 for British breakthrough act and in 2002, for best British single. In 2001, the group earned the Record of Year. S Club's second last single reached number-five in the UK charts and their final studio album failed to make the top ten. However, on 21 April 2003, during a live onstage performance, S Club announced that they were to disband.

2004–2007: Relentless and reality shows 
In 2004, O'Meara signed with Simon Fuller as her artist manager and began recording her debut solo album, planned to be released between September and December. The album would be focused on R&B sound and Fuller described O'Meara as "the next Christina Aguilera". In December 2004 she split from Fuller when the negotiations with Polydor Records failed and they disagreed over the recorded songs – he proposed that she record music from other composers, but she wanted an album with only songs written by her. She returned to the studio to record a new material, focused on pop rock style and produced by Richard Carpenter, and planned to release as debut single "Taxi Cab", "Lovely" or "Don't Wanna Let You Down", featured Lee Ryan, but failed to sign with a record label and the project was postponed.

In July 2005, O'Meara signed with Sanctuary Records and on 26 September was released her debut solo single, "What Hurts the Most", a version of Mark Wills's 2003 song. The song peaked at number 13 on the United Kingdom and 26 in Ireland. On 3 October she released her debut album, Relentless, produced by Brian Rawling, Graham Stack and Bill Padley. The album peaked at No. 48 in UK and it was described by music critics as "polished",  "well constructed" and "better than other ex boy and girl band" albums, citing the O'Meara "strong voice" In November the label began planning the second single but executives and O'Meara disagreed over the choice – between "To Ease Your Pain", "Wish I was Over You" or "Relentless" – and she left the label.

In February 2006, O'Meara took part in the BBC reality show Just the Two of Us. Her singing partner was Chris Fountain, actor on the Channel 4 soap opera Hollyoaks. The pair came third in the competition, failing to attract enough votes to make the final after their performance of "Never Had a Dream Come True". In January 2007, O'Meara appeared on Celebrity Big Brother. Along with Jade Goody and Danielle Lloyd, O'Meara was accused of racist and bullying behaviour toward fellow contestant Indian actress Shilpa Shetty, resulting in a record number of complaints to Ofcom, national and international media coverage, and condemnatory statements from the British and Indian governments.

2008–2020: S Club 3 and S Club 7 reunion 
In November 2008, O'Meara, Bradley McIntosh, and Paul Cattermole formed the spin-off group S Club 3 and have been performing in nightclubs, universities and Butlins holiday camps around the United Kingdom. On 12 November 2008 a bottle was thrown during their performance in Bradford. It struck O'Meara, leaving her with a cut to the head requiring hospital treatment. A 20-year-old man was arrested and it was suggested the attack was linked to her Celebrity Big Brother appearance.

O'Meara featured in a cover of the Python Lee Jackson song "In a Broken Dream" on The Popes' 2012 album New Church, her first released recording in seven years. She also appeared on stage with them performing the song. In November 2014, all seven original S Club 7 members reunited to perform a medley of some of their greatest hits on BBC Children In Need. They performed a reunion tour, Bring It All Back 2015, in May 2015.

Following the S Club reunion Jo continued to tour with Tina Barrett and Bradley McIntosh performing as S Club 3. In 2017, the trio released a single titled "Family" for charity but failed to chart in the UK.

In August 2020, O'Meara announced that she would no longer be performing as S Club 3 to focus on her upcoming second studio album. She was replaced by former S Club 8 member Stacey Franks, with the group renamed as "S Club Allstars".

2021–present: Solo career return and second S Club 7 reunion 
In April and May 2021, O'Meara released unplugged renditions of "Don't Stop Movin'" and "Relentless," respectively. Her second album, With Love, was released on 27 August 2021.

In 2022, O’Meara signed new management deal with Saga Entertainment with Jack Corbyn as her personal manager. This year also saw O'Meara taking to the stage at the London Palladium after releasing a cover of Radiohead classic  Creep.

In September 2022, O’Meara joined The Celebs to mark the 40th anniversary of the Michael Jackson classic album Thriller and raise money for Great Ormond Street Hospital, with a new rendition of the title track, which was released on independent record label Saga Entertainment and produced by Grahame and Jack Corbyn.

On 13 February 2023, it was announced that S Club 7 were to reunite for a second time for a new arena tour in October, to mark the 25th anniversary since their original formation. The tour will consist of 10 shows in the UK and 1 in Ireland.  An extra show was later added to the schedule at The O2 Arena in London due to huge demand.

Personal life 
In 2008, O'Meara gave birth to her son, after separating from her partner Bill Slate.

Discography

Albums

Singles

Promotional singles

Filmography

References

External links 

1979 births
21st-century British women singers
20th-century English actresses
21st-century English actresses
Alumni of the Italia Conti Academy of Theatre Arts
English film actresses
English mezzo-sopranos
English television actresses
English women pop singers
Living people
People from Romford
S Club 7 members